Chornomorske or Chernomorskoye  is an urban-type settlement and the administrative center of Chornomorske Raion in Crimea, a territory recognized by a majority of countries as part of Ukraine (the Autonomous Republic of Crimea) and incorporated by Russia as the Republic of Crimea. It is located on the northern edge of the Tarkhankut Peninsula. Population:  11,643 (2001 Census).

History

The first inhabitants on the shore of the current narrow bay were the Greeks as part of the Greek colonization of the Black Sea.  The city of Kalos Limen ( – Lovely Harbor) was founded on this site by Chersonesus in the second half of the 4th century BC. It was one of the important centers of agriculture and trade, among both Greek and Scythian centers.  By the middle of the 2nd century BC in the Greco-Scythian war, the town had been captured the Scythians.  Although liberated by Pontic intervention by the end of the 2nd century, it again fell under Scythian control by the mid-1st century BC to the early 2nd century AD.  Scythian control ended permanently thereafter, possibly owing to Roman intervention.	

In Russian the settlement was originally known  as Ak-Mechet, from the Crimean Tatar "", which literally means a white mosque. A mosque with a tall white minaret used to exist here. After the Crimean Tatars were forcibly deported in 1944, the settlement was given its present name, which alludes to the settlement's coastal location on the Black Sea.

Economy

Chornomorske is a peninsula offshore drilling center and base port, and where the company Chornomornaftogaz derives its name.

Climate
Chornomorske has a cool semi-arid climate (Köppen BSk) with very warm summers and cold, though not severe winters. Precipitation is low, and heaviest in the autumn months when cyclonic lows may produce significant falls.

References

Notes

Sources
Е. М. Поспелов (Ye. M. Pospelov). "Имена городов: вчера и сегодня (1917–1992). Топонимический словарь." (City Names: Yesterday and Today (1917–1992). Toponymic Dictionary." Москва, "Русские словари", 1993.

Urban-type settlements in Crimea
Port cities and towns in Ukraine
Port cities and towns in Russia
Port cities of the Black Sea
Seaside resorts in Ukraine
Seaside resorts in Russia
Chornomorske Raion
Chornomornaftogaz property